Lieutenant-General Sir Richard Denis Kelly KCB (9 March 1815 – 1897) was a British Army officer who became General Officer Commanding Eastern District.

Military career
Kelly was commissioned into the 49th (Royal Berkshire) Regiment of Foot in 1834. He became commanding officer of 34th (Cumberland) Regiment of Foot and, in that capacity, was wounded and taken prisoner at the Siege of Sevastopol during the Crimean War. He also took part in the Siege of Cawnpore in June 1857, the Siege of Lucknow in Autumn 1857 and the relief of Azimghur in April 1858 during the Indian Rebellion. He went on to be General Officer Commanding Cork District in April 1874 and General Officer Commanding Eastern District in April 1877.

He was also colonel of the Royal Irish Regiment from 1886 to 1889 and colonel of the Border Regiment from 1889 to his death in 1897.

He was buried at St Peter's Churchyard in Earley, Berkshire.

References

|-

|-

1815 births
1897 deaths
49th Regiment of Foot officers
British Army lieutenant generals
People from British Ceylon